The Association of Academies of the Spanish Language (ASALE) is an entity whose end is to work for the unity, integrity, and growth of the Spanish language. It was created in Mexico in 1951 and represents the union of all the separate academies in the Spanish-speaking world. The association publishes reference works on the Spanish language and commemorative editions of Hispanic literature, among other publications.

History
Through the initiative of then-president of Mexico Miguel Alemán Valdés, the first congress of academies convened with the purpose of maintaining the integrity of and fostering the further growth of Spanish. The meeting was held from 23 April to 6 May 1951 and resulted in the creation of the association and its permanent commission. The Royal Spanish Academy (Spanish:  or ) was not present at the initial meeting but participated in the permanent commission. Ever since the second congress convened in 1956, the  has been a regular participant.

An academy for Equatorial Guinea was created in 2013 and joined the association in 2016.

Congresses

Works
Joint projects include the editing of the Grammar and the compilation of the Dictionary of Americanisms.

Organization
The association convenes every four years, led by a Permanent Commission composed of a President (position held by the Director of the Spanish Royal Academy), a Secretary General (one of the directors of the other academies), a Treasurer (chosen by the Spanish Royal Academy), and at least two board members drawn from the associated academies, whose nomination rotate annually.  During the Third Congress of Academies, held in Bogotá, Colombia, in 1960, an agreement was reached whereby the governments of countries with a member in the association would be obliged to provide financial support to their respective academies and the greater association.

Academies

Although Israelis mainly speak Hebrew, Arabic, English, and Russian, an ASALE conference on Judaeo-Spanish held in 2015 led to plans for the creation of an Israeli branch. A group of academics was founded by ASALE in 2018 and submitted to the government of Israel for recognition. The National Academia of Judaeo-Spanish in Israel will then have the ability to petition to join as a full member, likely in 2019. There are no plans for Belize, Gibraltar, or Andorra to have their own academies, despite each having a majority Spanish-speaking population either as a first or second language. There is also a substantial Spanish population in Brazil and Western Sahara.

See also
Autoridad Nasionala del Ladino – a defunct Israeli body that regulated Ladino
Cervantes Institute – a Spanish cultural institution
Panhispanism – promotion of unity among Spanish speakers
List of language regulators

References

External links

 
Language regulators
Organisations based in Madrid
Organizations established in 1951
1951 establishments in Mexico
Hispanidad